St. Bridget and Blessed Hemming Church is a parish of the Roman Catholic Church in Turku, Finland. The church building, completed in 1966, is located in the center of Turku in Ursininkatu. It was consecrated in honor of St. Bridget of Sweden and bishop Hemming of Turku.

It is part of a group of Catholic parish buildings that were completed after 1966, including an administrative office and a residence. The Catholic history of Turku goes back over 80 years, with 1,194 members as of 2005, most of whom have foreign backgrounds (notably immigrants from Southeast Asia and Poland). The parish priest Father Peter Gebara SCJ (Brotherhood of the Sacred Heart of Jesus or Jeesuksen Pyhän Sydämen Veljeskunta), a native of Poland. The Church of Turku also has links to the Order of St. Brigid (birgittalaisluostari), a Catholic convent.

See also
Catholic Church in Finland
St. Henry's Cathedral

References

Buildings and structures in Turku
Roman Catholic churches completed in 1966
Churches in Turku
20th-century Roman Catholic church buildings in Finland